Reuther Nunataks is a ridgelike line of nunataks 4 nautical miles (7 km) long, located 3 nautical miles (6 km) west of Landmark Peak in the Founders Peaks, Heritage Range. Named by the University of Minnesota Geological Party to these mountains, 1963–64, for Charles J. Reuther, who served that season as helicopter technical representative with the 62nd Transportation Detachment.

Further reading
 G.F.Webers, K.B. Sporli, Palaeontological and Stratigraphic Investigations in the Ellsworth Mountains, West Antarctica, Antarctic Earth Science, p. 261-262

Nunataks of Ellsworth Land